Dughabad may refer to:

Afghanistan
 Dughabad, indea

Iran
 Dughabad, Jiroft, Kerman Province
 Dughabad, Rafsanjan, Kerman Province
 Dughabad, Rudbar-e Jonubi, Kerman Province
 Dughabad, Mahvelat, Razavi Khorasan Province